Robert Jack Daniel Meier (born August 29, 1977) is a former American football defensive tackle from Canada. He was drafted by the Jacksonville Jaguars in the seventh round of the 2000 NFL Draft. He played college football at Washington State.

Early years
Meier attended Sentinel Secondary School in British Columbia, Canada and was a letterman in football, basketball, and rugby. In football, as a senior, he was named the team's Offensive MVP, and was also an All-Provincial League selection. Meier graduated from Sentinel Secondary School in 1995.

College career
At Washington State University, Meier started 25 games (including the last 23) in four seasons, never missing a game, and played both defensive end and defensive tackle, making 133 career tackles.

Professional career

Jacksonville Jaguars
Meier was drafted by the Jacksonville Jaguars in the seventh round of the 2000 NFL Draft. On May 15, 2008, he signed a 5-year contract extension to remain with the Jaguars. He was released on February 11, 2010.

The fansided.com affiliate blackandteal.com ranked Meier as the 29th greatest Jaguar of all time.

References

1977 births
Living people
American football defensive tackles
Washington State Cougars football players
Canadian players of American football
Sportspeople from Vancouver
Jacksonville Jaguars players
Gridiron football people from British Columbia